Martin Page-Relo (born 6 January 1999) is a French-born Italian rugby union player, who plays for Stade Toulousain.

Club career 
Martin Page-Relo started playing rugby as a 5 years old in his hometown L'Isle-Jourdain, Gers, before moving to Stade Toulousain in 2012.

Page-Relo made his professional debut on loan from Stade Toulousain, with US Carcassonne on the 13 September 2020.

International career 
Martin Page-Relo was first called to the Italy senior team in March 2023 for the 2023 Six Nations Championship, being eligible for the selection per his maternal grandparents' Italian citizenship.

References

External link
All.rugby profile
Stade Toulousain profile (in French)

1999 births
Sportspeople from Gers
Living people
Italian rugby union players
French rugby union players
Rugby union scrum-halves
Stade Toulousain players